Holmestrand Aluminium Museum  (Aluminiummuseet i Holmestrand) is located in a former factory  of Hydro Aluminium AS in the centre of Holmestrand in Vestfold og Telemark, Norway.

Museum

Display
Holmestrand Aluminium Museum is a part of  Vestfold Museum (Vestfoldmuseene) and   opened in 2000.

The Aluminium Museum displays the history of aluminium processing in Holmestrand since the foundation of A/S Nordic Aluminium Industry in 1917. Production commenced in 1919  and is still in full operation. The rolling mill came to form the major and dominant part of the business in Holmestrand. Under the trade name Høyang , the company produced a wide range of goods, the best known being cookware including pans, coffee pots and pressure cookers. New items are constantly added, such as a 3-tonne piece of industrial machinery.

In the winter of 2009–10 the museum was the site of a multidisciplinary educational programme for all ninth-year students in northern Vestfold.

Norway's Digital Museum houses an online selection, mostly of cookware, from the Holmestrand Aluminium Museum.

Visiting

The museum is open daily except Mondays in the summer season. It opens Tuesdays and Thursdays all year, and also on Sundays from mid-April to October. Guided tours are available. The museum also houses the Holmestrand tourist information bureau, and has hosted an exhibit of photographs of the local mountain.

References

External links

 Aluminiummuseet Official website
Vestfoldmuseene official website

History museums in Norway
Industry museums in Norway
Museums in Vestfold og Telemark
Museums established in 2000
2000 establishments in Norway
Holmestrand